

Thomas Lord junior, was an English cricketer who played first-class cricket from 1815 to 1816. Mainly associated with Middlesex, he made five known appearances in first-class matches. He was the son of Thomas Lord, founder of Lord's Cricket Ground.

Early life 
Lord was born in 1794 and christened on 27 December 1794 at Marylebone. He died in 1875 at Westminster, London.

Notes

References

Further reading 
 H. S. Altham, A History of Cricket, Volume 1 (to 1914), George Allen & Unwin, 1962
 Derek Birley, A Social History of English Cricket, Aurum, 1999
 Rowland Bowen, Cricket: A History of its Growth and Development, Eyre & Spottiswoode, 1970

1794 births
1875 deaths
English cricketers
English cricketers of 1787 to 1825
Middlesex cricketers
Surrey cricketers
Marylebone Cricket Club cricketers